You’ll Have Had Your Hole is an in-yer-face stage play by Irvine Welsh. It is Welsh's first original play as his previous theatre pieces had been theatrical versions of his literary works, which had been adapted for the stage by other dramatists.

It premiered in February 1998 at the West Yorkshire Playhouse, Leeds before embarking on an international tour. The production was directed by Ian Brown who had previously directed Harry Gibson's successful stage adaptation of Welsh's novel Trainspotting.

Title meaning
The title, "You'll Have Had Your Hole", is a play on the expression "You'll have had your tea", a joke about Edinburgh's middle class supposed attitudes, implying a tightness in a host's attitude towards a guest. It means, "You're getting nothing for free here". The phrase 'getting your hole' is slang for having sex.

Reception
The first production of You’ll Have Had Your Hole in February 1998 by the West Yorkshire Playhouse was met with largely negative reviews. Robert Butler wrote in The Independent, “the Trainspotting author goes so far out his way to taunt us that one recoils from recoiling. He wants us to have a bad time”. Charles Spencer began in the Daily Telegraph, “The competition is undoubtedly strong but this is, I believe, the most obnoxious and contemptible play I have ever sat through”. Robert Gore-Langton in Express on Sunday concludes his review with, “I don’t know what Welsh’s message to us is, but mine to him is this: see a shrink or change your prescription”.  Much of the critical antipathy centered on the character of Laney, whom many critics called misogynistic, and Welsh’s use of elements of the romance formula alongside graphic violence.  Welsh said he was not concerned about the negative reviews as he was "working on the premise that condemnation from the out-of-touch is as valid an endorsement as praise from the hip".

References

Butler, Robert. “You’ll Have Had Your Hole”. Theatre Record. Vol 18, No 4: 1998. 221-225. (also published in Independent. 1.3.98)
Gore-Langton, Robert. Theatre Record. 18 (1998). 221-225. (also published in Express. 1.3.98)
Spencer, Charles. Theatre Record. Vol 18, No 4: 1998. 221-225. (also published in Daily Telegraph. 24.2.98)
Welsh, Irvine. You’ll Have Had Your Hole. Methuen, London: 1998.

1998 plays
Plays by Irvine Welsh
Plays set in Scotland